Viviana Ortiz Pastrana (born September 12, 1986) is a Puerto Rican actress, model and beauty pageant titleholder who was crowned Miss Universe Puerto Rico 2011 on November 4, 2010 and represented Puerto Rico at Miss Universe 2011 where she placed Top 16.

Early life
Ortiz was born in Corozal, Puerto Rico to Héctor Ortiz and Mercedes Pastrana. She is the middle child, and have an older sister and a younger brother.

She earned a bachelor's degree in telecommunications from the Sacred Heart University of Puerto Rico, graduating magna cum laude.

Miss Universe Puerto Rico
She competed in the 2011 Miss Universe pageant in São Paulo, Brazil on September 12, 2011, her 25th birthday, where she finished in the Top 16.

Nuestra Belleza Latina
Viviana competed in Univision's Nuestra Belleza Latina 2013 representing Puerto Rico and was part of Lupita Jones' team. After weeks of intense competition and challenges she made it to the top 5. She finished in third place and was awarded a scholarship to study acting at Televisa's Centro de Educacion Artistica (CEA) in Mexico.

Personal life
Since 2013, Viviana has been in a relationship with Puerto Rican NBA player, José Juan Barea. Viviana gave birth to their daughter, Paulina Barea Ortiz, on March 30, 2016. Ortiz and Barea got married on August 20, 2016 in a lavish ceremony at the church of the Universidad del Sagrado Corazón in San Juan, Puerto Rico.

References

External links
Official Miss Universe Puerto Rico website

1986 births
Living people
People from Corozal, Puerto Rico
Miss Puerto Rico winners
Miss Universe 2011 contestants
Universidad del Sagrado Corazón alumni